Hardcastle 5 is a smooth jazz album by producer/musician Paul Hardcastle. It is the fifth album in the Hardcastle series of smooth jazz albums, and the twenty-fifth overall. The album peaked at No. 176 on the Billboard 200 chart. The last track on his CD, "Take 1," introduces his son, Paul Hardcastle Jr. This was his first album with co-writer and vocalist Becki Biggins, who co-wrote the tracks Don't You Know, Closer, Blew My Mind, and Keep Movin On.

Track listing
 "In the Beginning" 1:29
 "Lucky Star" 3:48
 "Don't You Know" featuring Becki Biggins 5:33
 "Marimba" 3:52
 "Closer" featuring Becki Biggins  4:52
 "Return of the Rainman" 8:49
 "Blew My Mind" featuring Becki Biggins  6:17
 "Constellation of Dreams" 5:02
 "Don't You Know, Pt. 2" 5:08
 "Keep Movin On" featuring Becki Biggins  4:27
 "Revival" 3:58
 "Till the Next Time" 1:24
 "Take 1" (all music written and performed by Paul Hardcastle, Jr.) 4:01

References

2008 albums
Paul Hardcastle albums